De Sylva v. Ballentine, 351 U.S. 570 (1956), was a United States Supreme Court case in which the Court held after the death of an author, the widow and children are eligible to renew copyright, equally as a class. Additionally, conditional on state laws, illegitimate children are also eligible for a share of the copyright.

This extension to children and widows was not considered retroactive by courts, however. In Easton v. Universal Pictures Co., 288 N.Y.S. 2d 776 (1968), a 1951 document assigning control of a copyright from the author's family after his death was invalidated because "they had, in fact, as the law then appeared to be, nothing to assign." Another limitation to this new right of inheritance was that the family would not be eligible to renew the copyright if it had been passed permanently to another party, which was in line with Fred Fisher Music Co. v. M. Witmark & Sons.

References

External links
 

1956 in United States case law
United States copyright case law
United States Supreme Court cases
United States Supreme Court cases of the Warren Court